Lexi Holdings plc was a United Kingdom-based finance, property management, and property development company established in 2000 that went into administration in 2006. At its height it was one of the largest and fastest-growing independent short-term finance companies in the UK. It entered administration after a failure to reach terms on a new facility with its Bank Barclays and its Corporate Banking Director.

Background
The company was formed by Shaid Luqman, a British-born ethnic-Pakistani student at the University of Manchester, who studied finance. He bought his first house during his studies, striking a deal with the university's accommodation agency. This enabled him to approach banks for refinancing, and by the time of his graduation in 1991 he owned a portfolio of 24 flats and houses, which he rented out to fellow students.

History
In 2000 Luqman secured a loan of £2.5m from Barclays Bank to form Pearl Holdings. The company provided bridging loan-finance to high-net-worth individuals to build property portfolios, focusing mainly on projects which converted offices and hotels into flats. Providing agreed finance against a surveyor-agreed valuation of the final project, the company would lend within 24 hours. The loan would remain in place until project financing could be provided by a long-term lender.

Renamed Lexi Holdings plc in 2003, clients included MP's and footballers. In 2003 it was reported to be making profits of £21.4m on a turnover of £36m. The firm grew so well and quickly that in 2004 Luqman was named Entrepreneur of the Year by Ernst and Young.

At its peak, the company claimed to be worth £300M and own a Gulfstream IV business jet, while Luqman had a personal estimated wealth of £250m personal wealth, placing him 238th on the Sunday Times Rich List.

The company at the time of administration claimed to own 47 acres of residential development land at Ten Acres Lane Newton Heath Manchester worth an estimated  GBP 50m, the site of the former Mansfield Brewery in Nottingham worth an estimated  GBP 18.5m, a retail park in Leeds worth over GBP 20m a development site near Huddersfield worth in excess of  GBP 15m, two hotels in the Lake District and a prominent development site in Piccadilly Gardens, Manchester.

Administration
After protracted negotiations between Lexi and Barclays and the failure to reach a settlement with its bankers, administrators were appointed in 2006 over Lexi and associated company Ten Acre Limited.

At the time of the Lexi administration, its assets were in excess of GBP 180m and had liabilities of GBP 85  with an additional asset in the form of Ten Acre Limited valued then at  GBP 50m provided to Barclays.

Present
KPMG's Green and Fleming have recently obtained planning for 500 houses as well as commercial developments at this site with an end value of in excess of GBP 200m. There was, therefore, no loss sustained by any Lexi creditors, instead there will be a surplus of in excess of GBP 100m.

It emerged in the administrators latest report to creditors submitted to Companies House dated 23 October 2014 that the fees charged by the administrators and their associates had approached  GBP 40 million and Green and Fleming continue to bill the equivalent of GBP 57,000 per week for the average working week.

Shaid Luqman has since fled to Saudi Arabia where he is one of Jedda's largest property developers. He managed to fly out of the UK despite having his passports confiscated, and assets seized, with his brother.

References

Real estate companies established in 2000
British companies established in 2000
Defunct companies based in Manchester
Property companies of the United Kingdom
Finance fraud
Real estate companies disestablished in 2006
British companies disestablished in 2006